Princess of Naradhiwas University (PNU) is a government sponsored university in Narathiwat, southern Thailand. It was founded under the act on 9 February 2005 by merging all educational institutions in the province. Those institutions are Narathiwat Technical College, Narathiwat Agricultural & Technology College, Takbai Vocational College, and Boromarjonani College of Nursing, Narathiwat.

The name of the university was granted by King Bhumibol Adulyadej in honor of his sister Princess Galyani Vadhana, Princess of Naradhiwas.

Academic divisions
The university has 7 faculties
 Faculty of Agriculture
 Faculty of Engineering
 Faculty of Liberal Arts
 Faculty of Management Science
 Faculty of Medicine
 Faculty of Nursing
 Faculty of Science and Technology

Colleges and institutes organized by PNU
 Narathiwat Technical College
 Narathiwat Agricultural & Technology College
 Takbai Vocational College
 Institute of Islamic and Arabic Studies

International cooperations
Memoranda of understanding (MOU)
University of Baguio 
Kunming University 
Gate Stage University 
University of Illinois at Chicago (UIC) 
Al-Azhar University 
Group T-International University 
Alexandria University 
Universiti Utara Malaysia (UUM) 
Jenderal Soedirman University

Address
49, Rangaemaraka Rd. Bang Nak, Mueang Narathiwat, Narathiwat 96000, Thailand

External links

 Princess of Naradhiwas University official web site

Educational institutions established in 2005
Universities in Thailand
Narathiwat province
2005 establishments in Thailand